Michael Bishop may refer to:

Music
 Michael Bishop (bassist) (born 1968), American bassist, member of GWAR and Kepone
 Michael Bishop (sound engineer) (1951–2021), American musical engineer

Politics
 Michael Bishop, Baron Glendonbrook (born 1942), British businessman and politician
 Mike Bishop (politician) (born 1967), former Michigan State Senate Majority Leader and former U.S. Representative from Michigan

Sports
 Michael Bishop (cricketer) (born 1952), English cricketer
 Michael Bishop (gridiron football) (born 1976), American quarterback in NFL, CFL, and Arena Football League
 Mike Bishop (baseball) (1958–2005), former Major League Baseball player

Other
 Michael Bishop (author) (born 1945), American science fiction/fantasy author
 Michael Bishop (literary scholar) (born 1938), Canadian author and academic
 J. Michael Bishop (born 1936), American immunologist & microbiologist
 Michael Bishop, main character in the TV series Nikita

See also
 Michael David Bishop (disambiguation)